Black Lake is a lake located about  southwest of Olympia, Washington.  It has two outflows; the Black River, which drains into the Chehalis River and thence to Gray's Harbor and the Pacific Ocean, and Percival Creek, which drains into Capitol Lake and thence into Puget Sound.

Black Lake was so named on account of the dark character of its water. The nearby community of Belmore lies east of the lake.

References

Lakes of Thurston County, Washington